Croatian New Zealanders refers to New Zealand citizens of Croatian descent. It is estimated that over 100,000 New Zealanders have Croatian ancestry. There are 2,550 people who declared their nationality as Croats in the 2006 New Zealand census. The majority of these are located primarily in and around Auckland and Northland with small numbers in and around Canterbury and Southland.

The (generally neutral but sometimes mildly derogatory) term Dally or Dallie (short for Dalmatian) is often used in New Zealand to refer to people of Croatian descent. The term has been wholeheartedly adopted by Croatian New Zealanders, among them the Auckland-based Dalmatian Cultural Society. Founded in 1930, it is New Zealand's longest-surviving Croatian cultural organisation. A further neutral term, Tarara (literally, "fast talkers"), is used to refer to people of mixed Croatian–Māori heritage.

History
The earliest Croatian settlers in New Zealand date from the 1860s, largely arriving as sailors and pioneers, and as gold miners and prospectors during the Otago Gold Rush. The first person born in New Zealand of Croatian descent was Leander Thomas Pavletich in 1864. After the gold rush many moved to Northland attracted by kauri gum-digging, then a major source of income for Northland Māori and settlers. These early Dalmatian settlers were also responsible in large part for establishing the New Zealand wine industry. Forced off the kauri gumfields many moved into viticulture and winemaking instead, mainly in West Auckland around Kumeu, and in the Hawke's Bay region. Croatian family names such as Selak, Nobilo, Šoljan, Babich and Delegat still feature amongst the names of New Zealand's notable wineries, and two of the largest in New Zealand, Montana Wines (now Brancott Estate) and Villa Maria Estates, were established in the mid-20th century respectively by Croatian New Zealanders Ivan Yukich and Sir George Fistonich.

Croatian settlers have arrived in five main waves:

5,000 between 1890 and 1914, prior to World War I.
1,600 during the 1920s before the onset of the Great Depression.
600 in the 1930s, prior to World War II.
3,200 between 1945 and 1970.
Arrivals during the 1990s, fleeing the conflict in former Yugoslavia.

In July 2008, 800 people attended a celebration of 150 years of Croatian settlement in New Zealand hosted by Prime Minister Helen Clark and Ethnic Affairs Minister Chris Carter.

Notable Croatian New Zealanders

Academics 
Jadranka Travaš-Sejdić
James Belich - Historian

Arts

Architecture 
Stephen Jelicich - Founder of Jasmax/ JASMaD
Ivan Mercep - Founder of Jasmax/ JASMaD

Artists 
Billy Apple
Milan Mrkusich

Comedians 
Rose Matafeo
Nick Rado

Literature 
Amelia Batistich - Author
Sonja Yelich - Poet

Musicians 
Nick Afoa
Kevin Borich
Milan Borich (Pluto (New Zealand band))
Tina Cross
Maria Dallas
Brad Devcich (Fast Crew)
Lorde (Ella Yelich-O’Connor)
Peter Posa
Mike Perjanik
Desna Sisarich
Peter Urlich
Margaret Urlich

Business 
 Michael Erceg - Founder of Independent Liquor, now known as Asahi Beverages (NZ) Ltd.
Huljich family - Food manufacturing, property, new business startups, finance and movie-making.
Sir George Fistonich - Founder of Villa Maria Estates.
Nobilo family - Nikola Nobilo the founder of Nobilo wines.
 Talley family, owners of the Talley's Group.
 Dr. Kevin Glucina (founder Matakana Super Foods)

Fashion
 Deanna Didovich - Designer
 Jessica Grubisa - Designer
 Adrienne Winkelmann - Designer/ Fashion label

Journalism
Tony Ciprian - radio and television presenter
Simon Mercep - radio and television presenter
Goran Paladin - radio and television presenter

Law
 Brian Dickey - Crown Solicitor Auckland 
 Dame Helen Winkelmann - Chief Justice of New Zealand

Politics
Sir James Belich - Former Mayor of Wellington
Camilla Belich - Member of Parliament
Frana Cardno - Former Mayor of Southland District
Fred Gerbic - Former Member of Parliament
Shane Jones - Former Member of Parliament and cabinet minister
Clem Simich – Former Member of Parliament
Dame Mira Szaszy - Maori Leader
Dame Rangimarie Naida Glavish - Maori Leader

Religion
 Denis Devcich - Director of the Mother of God Brothers
 Antony Sumich (born 1964) – priest of Priestly Fraternity of Saint Peter; rugby union and cricket international (for Croatia)

Sports

Cricket 
Anton Devcich - BLACKCAPS representative
Joseph Yovich
Ben Lister
Dusan Hakaraia - also Croatia rugby representative
Quinn Sunde
Daniel Marsic - Croatia cricket representative
John Vujnovich - Croatia cricket representative
Anthony Govorko - Croatia cricket representative
Anton Vujcich - Croatia cricket representative
Paul Vujnovich - Croatia cricket representative

Football 
Abby Erceg – NZ Football Ferns football player
Tony Laus - All Whites football player
Stefan Marinovic - All Whites football player
Paul Urlovic - All Whites football player
Ivan Vicelich - All Whites football player
Chris Zoricich – All Whites football player

Motor sport
Robbie Francevic - motor racing driver
Paul Radisich – world touring car champion

Rugby 
Anthony Boric – All Blacks player
Kevin Boroevich – All Blacks player
Frano Botica – All Blacks / NZ rugby league/ Croatia Rugby
Matt Cooper – All Blacks / Croatia Rugby
Percy Erceg – All Blacks player
Sean Fitzpatrick - All Blacks player
Wayne Pivac - Rugby Union coach
Ron Urlich – All Blacks player
Ivan Vodanovich – All Blacks player / coach

Rugby League 
Frano Botica – All Black/ NZ rugby league/ Croatian Rugby
Tony Kriletich - NZ rugby league

Tennis
Marina Erakovic
Onny Parun

Other 
Frank Nobilo - golf player
John Radovonich – NZ hockey player
Anna Simcic - swimmer
Nick Unkovich - lawn bowls player
Michaela Sokolich-Beatson - netball player for the Northern Mystics and Silver Ferns
Greg Yelavich - shooter

Winemakers

 Babich
 Brajkovich - Kumeu River Wines
 Delegat
 Fistonich - Villa Maria Wines
 Mazuran
 Nobilo 
 Selak 
 Soljan
 Vuletic - Providence Wines
 Yukich - founder of Montana Wines now known as Brancott Estate

Fictional Croatian New Zealanders
Fisher Brankovic — Filthy Rich (television)
Darijo Doslic — Westside (television)
Draska Doslic — Outrageous Fortune (television)
 Mila Jizovich - bro'Town (television)
Johnny Marinovich — Shortland Street (television)
Nina — Broken English (film)

See also

 Croatian Australians
 Croats
 Dargaville
 European New Zealanders
 Europeans in Oceania
 Immigration to New Zealand
 List of Croats
 Pākehā

Literature 
Trupinić, Damir. (2009) New Zealand Croatian Immigrant Press 1899-1916, LAP Lambert Academic Publishing, .
Božić-Vrbančić, Senka. (2008) Tarara: Croats and Maori in New Zealand : memory, belonging, identity, Otago University Press, .

References

 
New Zealand
 
European New Zealander